Nemesis is a Finnish music group formed in Kokkola in 1987 by Ami Hassinen and Jyrki Kastman. In 1994 they released their debut album Xcelsior, the first Finnish electronic/ambient album to be released internationally. In 1996 Nemesis was commissioned by Finnish national radio YLE to create the long-form work Evolution, and from then on followed a series of critically acclaimed albums, as well as live concerts.

In 2001 the band was expanded with a third member, Joni Virtanen.

The band's music is inspired by astronomy, science fiction, nature, childhood stories about UFOs and ghosts, and also other music artists like Kraftwerk, Can, Tangerine Dream, Neu!, AD2, Jean Michel Jarre, Jimi Hendrix, The Beatles, Hawkwind, Brian Eno, Robert Rich, Steve Roach, and others.

Discography
This list is organized by release year. Titles are full-length CD albums unless otherwise mentioned.

{|class="wikitable"
! Year
! Title
! Label
! Comment
|-
||1994
| style="text-align:center;"|Xcelsior
| style="text-align:center;"|Barramundi
|
|-
||1996
| style="text-align:center;"|Cyberiad
| style="text-align:center;"|Retroduction Records
|
|-
||1999
| style="text-align:center;"|Sky Archeology
| style="text-align:center;"|Freeride
|
|-
||2001
| style="text-align:center;"|Music For Earports
| style="text-align:center;"|Retroduction Records
|
|-
||2002
| style="text-align:center;"|Kaiku
| style="text-align:center;"|Retroduction Records
| style="text-align:center;"|Soundtrack album for photo portfolio by Jyrki Portin. Music by Nemesis and M. Portin
|-
||2005
| style="text-align:center;"|Xtempora
| style="text-align:center;"|Retroduction Records
|
|-
||2006
| style="text-align:center;"|Live Archive Vol. 1 1995 - 2001 (Audio Archeology)
| style="text-align:center;"|Retroduction Records
| style="text-align:center;"|CDR with live recordings
|-
||2007
| style="text-align:center;"|Live Archive Vol. 2 1997 - 2004 (Stereofields Forever)
| style="text-align:center;"|Retroduction Records
| style="text-align:center;"|CDR with live recordings
|-
||2007
| style="text-align:center;"|Live Archive Vol. 3 1997-2006 (Trajectory Of Sound)
| style="text-align:center;"|Retroduction Records
| style="text-align:center;"|CDR with live recordings
|-
||2010
| style="text-align:center;"|Gigaherz
| style="text-align:center;"|Origo Sound
|
|-
||2010
| style="text-align:center;"|1:4:9
| style="text-align:center;"|Retroduction Records
| style="text-align:center;"|Soundtrack album for sculpture project by Kimmo Heikkilä.
|-
||2012
| style="text-align:center;"|Living Statues
| style="text-align:center;"|Retroduction Records
| style="text-align:center;"|theme album inspired by the life and work of Veijo Rönkkönen.
|-
||2014
| style="text-align:center;"|Xenopus
| style="text-align:center;"|Bandcamp
|
|-
||2016
| style="text-align:center;"|Nihilo Nihil (Soundtrack)
| style="text-align:center;"|Bandcamp
| style="text-align:center;"|Album dates from 1990, but was never released at the time.
|-
||2017
| style="text-align:center;"|Decades 1
| style="text-align:center;"|Bandcamp
|
|-
||2017
| style="text-align:center;"|Decades 2
| style="text-align:center;"|Bandcamp
|
|-
||2017
| style="text-align:center;"|Decades 3
| style="text-align:center;"|Bandcamp
|
|}

See also
 Electronic music
 Progressive electronic music
 Electronic art music
 Ishkur's Guide to Electronic Music
 Ambient music

References

External links
 Official band website
 Official band MySpace site
 Current label website
 Interview with the band

Ambient music groups
Finnish electronic music groups